Zarechny (masculine), Zarechnaya (feminine), or Zarechnoye (neuter) may refer to:
Zarechny (inhabited locality) (Zarechnaya, Zarechnoye), name of several inhabited localities in Russia
Zarechny Urban Okrug, name of several urban okrugs in Russia
Zarechny (volcano), a somma volcano on Kamchatka Peninsula, Russia
Zarechnaya (Nizhny Novgorod Metro), a station of the Nizhny Novgorod Metro, Russia
 Zarechnoye mine, a uranium mine in Kazakhstan